Formica obscuriventris is a species of ant in the family Formicidae.

Subspecies
These two subspecies belong to the species Formica obscuriventris:
 Formica obscuriventris clivia Creighton, 1940 i c g
 Formica obscuriventris obscuriventris Mayr, 1870 i c g
Data sources: i = ITIS, c = Catalogue of Life, g = GBIF, b = Bugguide.net

References

Further reading

 

obscuriventris
Articles created by Qbugbot
Insects described in 1870